The 2018 Shanghai Challenger was a professional tennis tournament played on hard courts. It was the eighth edition of the tournament which was part of the 2018 ATP Challenger Tour. It took place in Shanghai, China between 10 and 16 September 2018.

Singles main-draw entrants

Seeds

 1 Rankings are as of 27 August 2018.

Other entrants
The following players received wildcards into the singles main draw:
  Hua Runhao
  Te Rigele
  Wu Yibing
  Zhang Zhizhen

The following players received entry from the qualifying draw:
  Bai Yan
  Dayne Kelly
  Tristan Lamasine
  Aldin Šetkić

The following player received entry as a lucky loser:
  Viktor Durasovic

Champions

Singles

  Blaž Kavčič def.  Hiroki Moriya 6–1, 7–6(7–1).

Doubles

 Gong Maoxin /  Zhang Ze def.  Hua Runhao /  Zhang Zhizhen 6–4, 3–6, [10–4].

References

2018 ATP Challenger Tour
2018
2018 in Chinese tennis